The 2003 Chevy 500 was a race held at Texas Motor Speedway on Sunday, October 12, 2003. The race was the last race of the season for the 2003 IndyCar Series. The race was won by Gil de Ferran in what would be his last race in IndyCar with Scott Dixon winning his first of 6 IndyCar Series championships. The race was shortened by 195 of the scheduled 200 laps and was most remembered for a horrific crash by Kenny Bräck that nearly cost him his life.

Background
Texas Motor Speedway is a  oval located in Fort Worth, Texas. The track has been hosting IndyCar Series races since 1997.

Scott Dixon and Hélio Castroneves were tied for the points lead after the last race at California Speedway. Behind the 2 were Tony Kanaan (7 back), Sam Hornish Jr., (19 back), and Gil de Ferran (30 back) rounded out the top 5 in points.

Entry List
(R) denotes rookie driver

Qualifying
Gil de Ferran won the pole with Scott Dixon on the outside of Ferran in 2nd.

Race
Pole sitter Gil de Ferran led the first lap of the race. Scott Dixon pulled to his outside and edged out Ferran for the next 3 laps before Dixon fully surrendered it on lap 5. The first caution flew on lap 30 for debris. Tony Kanaan won the race off of pit road and was the new race leader. On lap 51, the second caution flew when rookie Ed Carpenter's car stalled and needed a tow back to the pit lane. Kanaan was still the race leader on the restart. On lap 82, the third caution flew for the same result as the previous caution when Ed Carpenter's car stalled for a second time and needed another tow back to the pit lane. Scott Dixon won the race off of pit road and was the new leader of the race. On the restart, Kanaan tried to challenge Dixon for the lead but failed to get in front of him. On lap 98, the fourth caution flew for a 3 car crash on the frontstretch involving Alex Barron, Felipe Giaffone, and Gil de Ferran. Ferran had some minor damage after going through the grass but was still able to continue on. The race restarted on lap 107 and Dixon still held on to the lead. On lap 138, Dixon began to battle for the lead with Sam Hornish Jr. who led that lap. Dixon was able to lead the next 2 laps before Hornish got in front of Dixon and took the lead. Green flag pitstops began with 50 laps to go in the race. After pit stops cycled through, Gil de Ferran was the new race leader. With 26 laps to go, the 5th caution flew when Richie Hearn crashed in turn 3. The race restarted with 22 laps to go and Ferran held on to his lead. On the restart, Tony Kanaan attempted to pass Ferran for the lead when he blew a left rear tire in turn 3 which caused Kanaan to slow down and ending his chances of winning.

Kenny Bräck crash

With 13 laps to go and on lap 187, a horrifying crash occurred. Down the backstretch, Tomas Scheckter was on the inside of Kenny Bräck racing for third place when Scheckter came up and made contact with Bräck. Bräck's car ramped on top of Scheckter's car, became airborne, and hit the catch fence with such force, it ripped everything out of the car except the cockpit disintegrating his car. Fortunately, no other cars were involved and Scheckter was ok, but Bräck was feared to be unconscious. Bräck was attended to by many track personnel trying to get him out of the car as the red flag flew out for the crash. Bräck was conscious and talking to everyone as he was lifted to Parkland Hospital in Dallas. Bräck had suffered multiple fractures, breaking his sternum, femur, shattering a vertebra in his spine and crushing his ankles. Thankfully, Bräck survived. With just 6 laps remaining in the race, officials decided to call the race and Gil de Ferran was the race winner. Scott Dixon and Dan Wheldon rounded out the podium and Dixon won the Series championship by 18 points over Ferran. 

A study showed that Bräck's crash measured a g-force of 214 g. It is believed to be the highest recorded g-forces ever by a crash that was survived by a driver. Bräck would make his comeback in the 2005 Indianapolis 500 replacing Buddy Rice starting 23rd and finishing 25th retiring with a mechanical problem.

Results

References

2003 in IndyCar
Texas Motor Speedway
2003 in sports in Texas